WSR-74 radars were Weather Surveillance Radars designed in 1974 for the National Weather Service. They were added to the existing network of the WSR-57 model to improve forecasts and severe weather warnings. Some have been sold to other countries like Australia, Greece, and Pakistan.

Radar properties 

There are two types in the WSR-74 series, which are almost identical except for operating frequency.  The WSR-74C (used for local warnings) operates in the C band, and the WSR-74S (used in the national network) operates in the S band (like the WSR-57 and the current WSR-88D).  S band frequencies are better suited because they are not attenuated significantly in heavy rain while the C Band is strongly attenuated, and has a generally shorter maximum effective range.

The WSR-74C uses a wavelength of 5.4 cm.  It also has a dish diameter of 8 feet, and a maximum range of 579 km (313 nm) as it was used only for reflectivities (see Doppler dilemma).

History 

The WSR-57 network was very spread out, with 66 radars to cover the entire country.  There was little to no overlap in case one of these vacuum-tube radars went down for maintenance.  The WSR-74 was introduced as a "gap filler", as well as an updated radar that, among other things, was transistor-based.  In the early 1970s, Enterprise Electronics Corporation (EEC), based out of Enterprise, Alabama won the contract to design, manufacture, test, and deliver the entire WSR-74 radar network (both C and S-Band versions).

WSR-74C radars were generally local-use radars that didn't operate unless severe weather was expected, while WSR-74S radars were generally used to replace WSR-57 radars in the national weather surveillance network.  When a network radar went down, a nearby local radar might have to supply updates like a network radar.  NWS Lubbock received the first WSR-74C in August 1973 following widespread attention from the Lubbock F5 tornado of 1970.

128 of the WSR-57 and WSR-74 model radars were spread across the country as the National Weather Service's radar network until the 1990s.  They were gradually replaced by the WSR-88D model (Weather Surveillance Radar - 1988, Doppler), constituting the NEXRAD network.  The WSR-74 had served the NWS for two decades.

The last WSR-74C used by the NWS was located in Williston, ND, before being decommissioned at the end of 2012. 

No WSR-74S's are in the NWS inventory today, having been replaced by the WSR-88D, but some of these radars are in commercial use.

Radar sites in the US 

WSR-74 sites include the following two categories:

See also

References 

National Weather Service weather radars